The Canad Inns Women's Classic is an event on the women's World Curling Tour. It is held at the Portage Curling Club in Portage la Prairie, Manitoba.

The event was formerly the second Grand Slam event of the season on the women's World Curling Tour. It was formerly held in October at the Fort Rouge Curling Club in Winnipeg, Manitoba. It became a Grand Slam event in 2006, but was removed from the Grand Slam after the 2013–14 curling season. Since 2009, the total prize money to be given out has been $60,000. The event was also known as the "Casinos of Winnipeg Women's Curling Classic" before 2009 and the "Manitoba Lotteries Women's Curling Classic" from 2009 to 2012.

Champions

Results

2006 Casinos of Winnipeg Classic
Playoffs

2007 Casinos of Winnipeg Classic

Playoffs

References

Women's World Curling Tour events
Sport in Portage la Prairie
Curling competitions in Manitoba
Former Grand Slam (curling) events
Recurring sporting events established in 2004
2004 establishments in Manitoba